Walter Couper Rutherford (14 January 1891 – 1 December 1944) was a Scottish footballer who played as an inside left. He joined Kilmarnock from the junior leagues during World War I and quickly made an impact, scoring a hat-trick against Rangers, playing one match on loan for Rangers a week later, and being selected for the Scottish Football League XI in a fundraising match, all in 1917. However, he sustained a serious injury midway through the next season, with a benefit match being arranged for him against Celtic in April 1919 to provide an income, as he had been unable to work or play football during that time. Rutherford did not play for Kilmarnock again but was able to make a comeback of sorts, firstly with non-league Alloa Athletic followed by Ayr United and then Johnstone, with a second, swansong spell there 18 months after his first ended.

References

1891 births
1944 deaths
Scottish footballers
Footballers from Glasgow
People from Gorbals
Association football inside forwards
Maryhill F.C. players
Yoker Athletic F.C. players
Kilmarnock F.C. players
Rangers F.C. players
Alloa Athletic F.C. players
Johnstone F.C. players
Ayr United F.C. players
Carlisle United F.C. managers
Scottish Football League players
Scottish Football League representative players
Scottish Junior Football Association players
Scottish football managers